Walter Smith (1948–2021) was a Scottish football player and manager.

Walter Smith may also refer to:

Politicians
Walter I. Smith (1862–1922), American politician, U.S. Representative from Iowa and U.S. federal judge 
Walter Bedell Smith (1895–1961), American Army general, diplomat, and politician
Walter Smith (British politician) (1872–1942), Member of Parliament for Wellingborough, 1918–1922, and Norwich, 1923–1924 and 1929–1931
Walter Bernard Smith (1912–1987), Canadian politician, member of the House of Commons
Walter L. Smith Jr. (1917–1994), American politician in New Jersey

Sports
Walter Smith (American football) (1875–1955), American football player and military officer
Red Smith (sportswriter) (Walter Wellesley Smith, 1905–1982), American sportswriter
Walter Parry Haskett Smith (1859–1946), British rock climber
Walter Smith (footballer, born 1884) (1884–1972), English football player
Walter Smith (winger) (fl. 1891–1893), English football player
Walter Smith (cricketer) (1913–2007), English cricketer
Wally Smith (footballer, born 1885) (1885–?), English footballer

Others
Walter Smith (art educator) (1836–1886), British art educator and author of drawing books and books on industrial art education
Walter Smith (land surveyor) (1920–2018), first civilian director of the Ordnance Survey
Walter B. Smith (Medal of Honor) (1827–?), American sailor and Medal of Honor recipient
Walter Campbell Smith (1887–1988), British mineralogist and petrologist
Walter Chalmers Smith (1824–1908), Scottish poet and minister of the Free Church of Scotland
Wally Smith (mathematician) (born 1926), American mathematician
Walter Mackersie Smith (1842–1906), Scottish engineer 
Walter Mickle Smith (1867–1953), American civil engineer
Walter Scott Smith Jr. (born 1940), United States federal judge
Walter Smith, pseudonym of spammer Davis Wolfgang Hawke
Walter Smith (bushman) (1898–1990), Australian bushman 
Walter Edmond Smith (1895–1976), Australian Army officer and industrialist
Walter Smith III (born 1980), American jazz saxophonist and composer
Walter Whately Smith (1892–1947), British parapsychologist
Walter L. Smith (scholar), president emeritus of Florida A&M University
Walter H. F. Smith, geophysicist
J. Walter Smith, editor of the American edition of The Strand Magazine

See also
Walter Smith, a non-playable character of Ninja Gaiden
Wally Smith (disambiguation)
John Walter Smith (1845–1925), politician in Maryland
Walter E. Smithe, Illinois-based furniture company